Sidi Amar is a town and commune in Saïda Province in north-western Algeria.

References

Communes of Saïda Province
Cities in Algeria